Jenner may refer to:

 Jenner (name), a surname, including a list of people with the name
Jenner, Alberta, Canada
Jenner, California, United States
Jenner Township, Somerset County, Pennsylvania, United States
Jenner (mountain), a mountain in Bavaria, Germany
 Jenner (crater), a lunar crater in the Mare Australe on the far side of the Moon
Jenner & Block, an American law firm
Jenners, a department store in Edinburgh